VST 2 is the second studio album by Filipino Manila sound group VST & Company released in 1978. It features the disco hits "Swing" and "Step No, Step Yes", which were both featured on the film Swing It, Baby starring Vilma Santos, Romeo Vasquez, TVJ and VST themselves. Although the actual group played on the first album VST, session musicians were used for this album.

Val Sotto who was also a comedian and actor and the brother of Tito and Vic Sotto received his first writing credit on "VST Galactica" (titled "Galactic" in the label of the original 1978 release and credited to "Rosario Unite and Edward Rigor"). The last song "Salamat" (Thank You), features the vocal intro of "Swing".

Track listing

Personnel
According to the album credits.
VST & Co.
Celso Llarina - rhythm guitar, vocals
Spanky Rigor - executive producer
Vic Sotto - lead and background vocals (not credited)
Session musicians credited as 'rhythm section'
Homer Flores
Boy Alcaide
Jun Regalado
Lorrie Lustre
Roger Herrera
Toti Fuentes

References

1978 albums
VST & Co. albums